The 1978 Tangerine Bowl was an American college football bowl game that was played on December 23, 1978 at Orlando Stadium in Orlando, Florida. It was the final contest of the 1978 NCAA Division I-A football season for both teams. The game ended in a 30–17 victory for the Wolfpack.

Teams
The game was the first bowl game featuring the Panthers and the Wolfpack, and was their third overall meeting. Pittsburgh led the series  heading into the game, and the teams' previous meeting was in 1953, when the Panthers defeated the Wolfpack 40–6.

Game summary

Statistics

Scoring summary

References

Tangerine Bowl
Citrus Bowl (game)
NC State Wolfpack football bowl games
Pittsburgh Panthers football bowl games
Tangerine Bowl
Tangerine Bowl